Raam or RAAM may refer to:

 Rama, also known as "Raam", a deity in Hinduism
 Raam (2005 film), a 2005 Tamil film
 Raam (2006 film), a 2006 Telugu film
 Raam (2009 film), a 2009 Kannada language film
 Raam (currency), a local currency of the Global Country of World Peace in use in Vlodrop, Netherlands and Maharishi Vedic City, Iowa
 Raam (West Papua), an island and a settlement in West Papua, Indonesia
 Race Across America, a bicycle race
 United Arab List, a political party in Israel (Ra'am being a Hebrew acronym of Reshima Aravit Me'uchedet)
 General RAAM, a character in Gears of War, a general of the locust horde

People with the surname
 Villem Raam (1910–1996), Estonian art historian

See also 

 Remote Anti-Armor Mine System (RAAMS)